Hassan K. Khalil (born February 20, 1950 in Cairo) is an Egyptian-born American electrical engineer.  He was named Fellow of the Institute of Electrical and Electronics Engineers (IEEE) in 1989 for contributions to singular perturbation theory and its application to control.

Khalil received a BS and MS from Cairo University in 1973 and 1975 respectively, and a PhD from the University of Illinois in 1978, under Petar V. Kokotovic.  He became an assistant professor at MSU at 1978, and became a University Distinguished Professor in 2003.

Khalil was an Associate Editor of the  IEEE Transactions on Automatic Control, Automatica, and Neural Networks, and was Editor of Automatica.  Khalil retired on May 15, 2020, and was granted emeritus status.

Selected articles
  (Cited 900 times, according to Google Scholar.)  

  (Cited 880 times, according to Google Scholar.)  

  (Cited 739 times, according to Google Scholar.) 

  (Cited 658 times, according to Google Scholar.)

  (Cited 582 times, according to Google Scholar.)

Awards

 Fellow of the Institute of Electrical and Electronics Engineers (IEEE), 1989, for contributions to singular perturbation theory and its application to control.

 Fellow of the International Federation of Automatic Control (IFAC), 2007, for contribution to singular perturbation theory, nonlinear feedback control and control education.

 George S. Axelby Outstanding Paper Award, IEEE Control Systems Society, 1989.

 John R. Ragazzini Education Award, American Automatic Control Council, 2000.

References

1950 births
Living people

Fellow Members of the IEEE

Engineers from Cairo
21st-century American engineers
Egyptian emigrants to the United States
University of Illinois alumni
Egyptian electrical engineers
Cairo University alumni
20th-century American engineers
American electrical engineers